Soveychti-ye Do (also Romanized as Soveychtī-ye Do; also known as Soveychetī-ye Do-ye Soflá, Soveychetī-ye Marhach, Soveychtī, Soveychtī-ye Marhech, Soveychtī-ye Rahach, and Soveychtī-ye Yek) is a village in Gharb-e Karun Rural District, in the Central District of Khorramshahr County, Khuzestan Province, Iran. At the 2006 census, its population was 434, in 77 families.

References 

Populated places in Khorramshahr County